Referendum 74 (R-74 or Ref 74) was a Washington state referendum to approve or reject the February 2012 bill that would legalize same-sex marriage in the state. On June 12, 2012, state officials announced that enough signatures in favor of the referendum had been submitted and scheduled the referendum to appear on the ballot in the November 6 general election. The law was upheld by voters in the November 6, 2012 election by a final margin of 7.4% (53.7% approve, 46.3% reject) and the result was certified on December 5.

Ballot measure
The ballot title read as follows:

The following summary accompanied the ballot measure:

History

Title 26 of the Revised Code of Washington, entitled "domestic relations", governs marriage in Washington state. A 2012 bill, Senate Bill 6239, would legalize same-sex marriage and convert into a marriage on June 30, 2014, any undissolved state registered domestic partnership that does not involve at least one party aged 62 years or older. It also would add language in Section 26.04.010 exempting religious organizations from any requirement to "provide accommodations, facilities, advantages, privileges, services, or goods related to the solemnization or celebration of a marriage". Governor Christine Gregoire signed the engrossed bill on February 13. The bill was scheduled to take effect June 7 – 90 days after the legislative session — but opponents submitted on June 6 the necessary signatures to suspend the bill and require a statewide voter referendum. On June 12, the Washington secretary of state announced that they had submitted enough signatures to place the referendum on the ballot for the November general election.

Support and opposition
Statements for and against the bill are available online as part of the official online voter's guide for the referendum. Per Section 42.17A on "campaign disclosure and contribution", the Washington state Public Disclosure Commission posted campaign information online, including information for referendums and initiatives, showing seven groups registered for approval of the bill and one against. Of these, Washington United for Marriage (WUM) and Preserve Marriage Washington were the most active, for and against the bill, respectively.

WUM lists "a coalition of more than 500 organizations and businesses" on its website. Amazon's Jeff Bezos and his then-wife pledged $2.5 million to support the same-sex marriage law. Steve Ballmer of Microsoft and co-founder Bill Gates each donated $100,000 to the campaign in support as well. Starbucks, Nike, Inc., REI, Alcoa, Expedia, Inc., T-Mobile, Nordstrom, the Seattle Metropolitan Chamber of Commerce, and dozens of other businesses also supported the bill. United States President Barack Obama encouraged support as well.

Opposition to the bill was coordinated largely by the National Organization for Marriage (NOM) and the Roman Catholic Archdiocese of Seattle, which encouraged support for rejecting the bill among all parishes. Parishes planned "in-pew donations as part of what it is calling Preserve Marriage month" and NOM was expected to bring in additional money from outside the state.

Several newspapers in Washington state supported the bill, with the Seattle Times also launching an interactive social media campaign to encourage readers to support the bill publicly. Other endorsements included the Tacoma News-Tribune, Spokane's The Spokesman-Review, Vancouver's The Columbian, Yakima Herald-Republic, Tri-City Herald, Everett's The Herald, The Olympian, The Wenatchee World, and the Walla Walla Union-Bulletin.

Campaign fundraising
Referendum 74 generated a large number of individual donations which may have surpassed the 2008 record of 13,500 for the Washington Death with Dignity Act. As of July 3, 2012, Referendum 74 sponsor Preserve Marriage Washington (seeking "rejection" votes) had reportedly raised $132,000, while Washington United for Marriage (seeking "approval" votes) raised $1.9 million. As of August, campaign-financing proponents showed a 13-to-1 fundraising advantage for same-sex marriage, but a National Organization for Marriage campaign director was confident that $4 million would appear as needed. A Public Disclosure Commission complaint has been filed, accusing both Preserve Marriage Washington and the National Organization for Marriage of having failed to report donations as required by law. As of October 5, 2012, proponents of Referendum 74 Washington United for Marriage have raised $9.4 million in donations and opponents Preserve Marriage Washington have raised about $1 million.

Opinion polls
Various public opinion surveys of Washington residents asked questions regarding same-sex marriage. The questions vary, with some surveys referring directly to Referendum 74 and others asking more general questions. A post-election poll indicated much stronger support for such marriage among women than men across several categories.

Results

County breakdown

Upon certification, Secretary of State Sam Reed partially credited the referendum for encouraging voter turnout of 81%, the highest in the nation. County offices in King and Thurston counties opened at 12:01 a.m. after the measure was certified, with celebrations in support outside of several government offices, with various same-sex weddings scheduled, free of charge, beginning just after midnight on December 9, just after the mandatory three-day waiting period applying to all Washington weddings.

See also 
Andersen v. King County
Domestic partnership in Washington state
LGBT rights in Washington (state)
Minnesota Amendment 1
Same-sex marriage in Washington state
Washington Referendum 71 (2009)

Other same-sex marriage referendums
 Australian Marriage Law Postal Survey, 2017
 2016 Bermudian same-sex union and marriage referendum
 2013 Croatian constitutional referendum
 Irish same-sex marriage referendum, 2015
 2015 Slovak same-sex marriage referendum
 2015 Slovenian same-sex marriage referendum
 United States:
 2008 California Proposition 8
 Maine:
 2009 Maine same-sex marriage referendum
 2012 Maine same-sex marriage referendum
 2012 Maryland same-sex marriage referendum
 2012 Washington same-sex marriage referendum

References

External links
 Preserve Marriage Washington to reject "redefining marriage"
 Washington United for Marriage to approve "marriage equality"
 November 06, 2012 General Election Results: Referendum Measure No. 74 Concerns marriage for same-sex couples

Washington (state) law
LGBT in Washington (state)
LGBT law in the United States
2012 Washington (state) ballot measures
2012 in LGBT history
Same-sex marriage ballot measures in the United States